Kuala Lumpur Hospital (abbr: HKL) is a Largest Malaysian government-owned public general hospital in Kuala Lumpur, the capital city of Malaysia. Founded in 1870, HKL is a not-for-profit institution and serves as the flagship hospital of the Malaysian public healthcare system. This hospital serves as a tertiary and referral hospital. It is located on 150 acres of prime land in the city with 84 wards and 2,300 beds, making it one of the largest hospitals in the world. More than 90 per cent of the beds in HKL are allocated for subsidized patients, providing access to an internationally established standard of affordable healthcare.

The Kuala Lumpur Hospital or HKL has 54 different departments and units. These include 29 clinical departments and 15 clinical support services. HKL has approximately 11,000 staff with almost 2,300 professionals in various fields and disciplines. Out of the total number of staff, there are 300 medical consultants and specialists, 1,300 medical officers, 72 matrons, 253 sisters (ward managers) and 3,500 registered nurses and 258 community nurses.

History and future developments
 1870: HKL was developed as a district hospital with three wards.
 1920: Upgraded to 25 wards with 1st class, 2nd class and 3rd class wards classifications.
 1962: Maternity Hospital, North Ward Block, Radiotherapy Department and Hostels for staff were built.
 1972: South Ward Block, Neurology Institute, Surgical Block, Radiology Block, National Blood Transfusion Centre and more hostels were added.
 1973: Specialist clinics, Outpatient Department and Doctor's hostel were constructed.
 1974: Trainee Nurses hostel and Clubhouse added.
 1975: Orthopaedic Institute, Urology Institute, Artificial Limb Centre and Radiology Block were established.
 1992: Paediatric Institute was constructed.
 1997: Upgrading of the Institute of Radiotherapy, Oncology and Nuclear Medicine.
 2013: Specialist Complex & Ambulatory Care Centre (SCACC) was opened, consisting of 16 clinical departments, support services such as pharmacy, pathology, radiology, Central Sterile Supply Unit (CSSU) and allied health services. SCACC providing 30 beds for daycare patients, 184 consultations rooms, 7 seminar rooms and the Clinical Research Centre (CRC).
 2017: A new 12-storey Women and Children’s Hospital (WCH) with 600 beds built at a cost of RM 850 million is scheduled to open within HKL's compound, offering services such as labour and delivery, nursery, therapy and women specialist clinics, child development center, pediatric specialist clinics, women health center, neonatal intensive care and obstetric wards. Future plans include a "school within a hospital" facility for children who are on long-term treatment and hospital-bound.

Statistics
HKL handles over one million outpatients annually and 131,639 in-patients in 2015. In 2015, the total management expenditure for HKL reached RM 1 billion whilst development expenditure exceeded RM 17 million. On average, HKL handles over 3,300 outpatient cases daily. The average hospital admission on a daily basis was over 360 cases, with over 44,500 surgeries and 14 million lab investigations were conducted annually.

Medical achievements
 1964: A Kolff Dialysis machine was placed in HKL for the treatment of acute kidney injury. Also installed were the Thyroid Uptake Machine and a Rectilinear Scanner at the Nuclear Medicine unit.
 1970: The first plastic surgical procedure and the first regular plastic surgery clinic were conducted at HKL.
 1975: The first renal transplantation (living related) in Malaysia was performed at HKL, utilising an immunosuppressive protocol combining azathioprine and corticosteroids.
 1976: The first cadaver renal transplantation in Malaysia was performed at HKL.
 1993: A bone bank was established in HKL, supplying deep frozen bone allografts to across the country.
 1994: The first bone marrow transplant service started in HKL.
 2012: HKL oversaw the first successful kidney transplant between a husband and wife with different blood types. Also, a pair of conjoined twins were successfully separated at HKL in a 24-hour surgery involving a 60-strong medical team including 19 surgeons and anaesthetists, making them the 14th conjoined pair to be separated at HKL.

Facilities and transportation
Among the facilities available at the Kuala Lumpur Hospital include banking & finance, cafeteria, convenience stores, gymnasium, tennis court, police station and a post office. The library and resource center for HKL patients and visitors is located at the main block. Mobile library services are available in selected wards. HKL also provides subsidized intermediate care and short-term accommodation for patients and caregivers who are not able to afford high living costs in the city.

The hospital is accessible within walking distance east of the Titiwangsa Station. However, when the MRT Putrajaya line phase 2 opens in 2023, Hospital KL station will better serve the hospital and the surrounding vicinity. Bus stop and taxi stands are available. There are 1,950 car park bays at HKL equipped with wireless parking lot detection and guidance system. By the end of 2017, there will be additional 1,270 car park bays with the opening of the Women and Children’s Hospital (WCH) in HKL.

Awards
Global Brands Magazine Awards 2016 - Best Hospital Brand in Malaysia

See also
 Healthcare in Malaysia

References

External links
 
 Visiting hours at HKL
 Clinical Research Centre, Hospital Kuala Lumpur (CRC HKL)
 HKL corporate video
 Ministry of Health, Malaysia

1870 establishments in the Straits Settlements
Hospitals established in 1870
Hospitals in Kuala Lumpur